Linotte is an interpreted 4th generation programming language. Linotte's syntax is in French.

The language's goal is to allow French-speaking children and other francophones with little computer science experience to easily learn programming, with the slogan (in French) "you know how to read a book, so you can write a computer program".

Vocabulary 

Linotte uses a non-technical vocabulary entirely in French. Its terms are closer to those used in film or literature, with a program being a book, a variable being an actor, and the screen a canvas. Instead of executing a book, it is read.

The function body starts at "début", French for "start". Keywords
that in other languages might be named things "print" or "log" in Linotte are named things like "affiche", French for "display":

  BonjourLeMonde:
    début
      affiche "Bonjour le monde !"

Similarly, a program can "demande", or ask, to prompt the user to enter a value.

Capabilities 

Linotte also supports things like networking and graphics, and even contains a web templating engine that allows the mixing of HTML and Linotte in the same file, much like PHP or JSP.

References

Fourth-generation programming languages
French-language works
Non-English-based programming languages
Software using the GPL license
Programming languages created in 2005